Rodney Edward Quantock  (born 1948) is an Australian stand-up comedian and writer. Quantock is known for his pioneering style of stand-up comedy, which is often politically driven, as well as being the face of bed retailer Capt'n Snooze for many years. Described as "a living Melbourne treasure" by The Age newspaper, he has also achieved great prominence with his involvement in political activism and social justice and as a speaker at many public and corporate events.

Biography

Early life
Quantock grew up in Coburg. His father worked in Fitzroy in a metal polishing factory and as a tram conductor. Before venturing into professional comedy, Quantock studied architecture at the University of Melbourne for 5 years. His interest in comedy started at the university Architect's revue in 1969, where he felt extremely comfortable once onstage. It was here that he met his future wife Mary Kenneally. One of Quantock's sisters, Loris, is a Sydney-based artist.

Break into theatre
Quantock's break into theatre came in the early '70s. Quantock played a large part in the rebirth of live theatre in Australia in the '70s, conceiving and performing in full-scale productions for many of Australia's comedy venues including The Flying Trapeze Cafe, Foibles Theatre Restaurant, The Last Laugh, The Comedy Café and the Trades Hall.

Along with Kenneally, Geoff Brooks and Stephen Blackburn, Quantock opened and operated The Comedy Cafe and Banana Lounge.

Television
Quantock became more involved in television in the early 80s and the 90s, working on the series Ratbags, Australia You're Standing In It, Fast Forward, Denton, BackBerner and was a regular on The Big Gig and Good News Week.

In 2005, he appeared as the subject of an art exhibition displayed at Crown Casino.

Quantock was a founding member on the Melbourne International Comedy Festival board, a consultant to the Melbourne Moomba Festival and a member of the Arts Committee of the Bicentennial BHP Awards For Excellence.

Capt'n Snooze
Quantock starred in a series of television advertisements for bed retailer Capt'n Snooze from the '80s to the late '90s. In a working relationship spanning 18 years, Quantock explains that there were "a lot of things about Capt'n Snooze that were good and a lot of things that were bad" but concedes that his main reason for continuing to be the face of Capt'n Snooze was financial:They said, "All you've got to do is wear a little nightshirt and put a hat on and jump up and down on beds and you can have that semi-trailer full of money". But I think it made me a bit less ambitious in terms of comedy. I mean I won’t go into the details, but we’ve had a lot of medical problems in our family, so that money took a lot of pressure off working professionally as a comedian. So I regret it at that level. I think I probably would be a better comedian, doing more interesting things if I hadn't have had that in my life.

Bus
Quantock conducted various evening bus tours of Melbourne and other parts of Victoria since the early '80s, a concept called Bus, Son of Tram or just Bus, where a group of people would travel on a bus with him to a surprise location to meet other people who had no idea of their coming. The success of the bus tour depended largely on the element of surprise and the results were almost always comical. Quantock saw it as a way of seeing how frightened people have become:We've got gated communities; we've got car alarms; we've got people putting steel shutters over their windows at night. People are frightened – of other people taking what they've got, of being killed, I suppose – so the thing I am going to find most interesting is how severe security has become but also as a way of introduc[ing] unsuspecting people to this idea that the world's not such a frightening place and you can have fun with strangers."
The audience members were all given Groucho Marx masks and Rod carried a rubber chicken on a stick, named Trevor.

Political activism

Quantock supports left-wing politics and was the host of the 1997, 1998 and 2004 Ska-TV Activist awards which were broadcast on community television around Australia.

He gave a speech at 17 January 2010 rally at the closure of The Tote Hotel.

He was MC at a number of rallies and public meetings in the campaign to stop the East-West Link.
.

In 2014, Quantock became a research associate at the Melbourne Sustainable Society Institute, University of Melbourne, working on the presentation of climate change impacts and resource crises.

Double Disillusion
From 1989–1994, Quantock was a weekly columnist for the Sunday Age and in September 1999, Double Disillusion, a compilation book of these columns and some of his live performances, was published.

Awards
Order of Australia Medal (2015)
Director's Award, Melbourne International Comedy Festival (2012)
Australia Council Theatre Board Fellowship (2007)
Quantock received a Green Room Award for his one-man show Sunrise Boulevard (1997).
The Individual Award at the Sydney Myer Performing Arts Awards (2004).

Quantock was the recipient of the Adelaide Justice Coalition Romero Community Award for his contribution to Australian social justice (2005).

Biography by year

References

External links 

1949 births
Australian activists
Australian male comedians
Australian political commentators
Australian sketch comedians
Australian stand-up comedians
Climate activists
Comedians from Melbourne
Living people
Radio personalities from Melbourne
Recipients of the Medal of the Order of Australia
Australian social commentators
People from Coburg, Victoria